In North America, Italian sausage (salsiccia  in Italian) most often refers to a style of pork sausage. The sausage is often noted for being seasoned with fennel as the primary seasoning. In Italy, however, a wide variety of sausages are made, many of which are quite different from the aforementioned product.

The most common varieties marketed as "Italian sausage" in supermarkets are hot, sweet, and mild. The main difference between hot and mild is the addition of hot red pepper flakes to the spice mix of the former. The difference between mild and sweet is the addition of sweet basil in the latter.  

In Australia, a variety of mild salsiccia fresca (literally meaning "fresh sausage") seasoned primarily with fennel is sold as "Italian sausage".

History 

Initially known as "lucanica", the first evidence of the sausage dates back to the 1st century BC, when the Roman historian Marcus Terentius Varro described stuffing spiced and salted meat into pig intestines, as follows: "They call lucanica a minced meat stuffed into a casing, because our soldiers learned how to prepare it". The writings of Cicero and Martial also mention Lucania as the birthplace of the sausage, confirming its origins in Basilicata.

See also 
 Sausage and peppers
 Sausage sandwich

References

American sausages
Italian sausages
Italian-American cuisine
Italian-American culture in New York City
Cuisine of New York City
Fresh sausages